The 1992–93 Southern Illinois Salukis men's basketball team represented Southern Illinois University Carbondale during the 1992–93 NCAA Division I men's basketball season. The Salukis were led by fourth-year head coach Bruce Weber and played their home games at the SIU Arena in Carbondale, Illinois as members of the Missouri Valley Conference. They finished the season 23–10, 12–6 in MVC play to finish in second place. The Salukis won the MVC tournament to receive an automatic bid to the NCAA tournament as No. 14 seed in the Midwest region. The Salukis fell to two-time defending champion and No. 3 seed Duke in the opening round.

Roster

Schedule and results

|-
!colspan=12 style=| Non-conference regular season

|-
!colspan=12 style=| Missouri Valley regular season

|-
!colspan=12 style=| Missouri Valley tournament

|-
!colspan=12 style=| NCAA tournament

References

2001-02
1992–93 Missouri Valley Conference men's basketball season
Southern Illinois
1992 in sports in Illinois
1993 in sports in Illinois